The 1971 Tulsa Golden Hurricane football team represented the University of Tulsa as a member of the Missouri Valley Conference (MVC) during the 1971 NCAA University Division football season. In their second year under head coach Claude "Hoot" Gibson, the Golden Hurricane compiled an overall record of 4–7 with a mark of 3–2 in conference play, placing in a three-way tie for second in the MVC.

The team's statistical leaders included Todd Starks with 1,687 passing yards, Mike Ridley with 311 rushing yards, and Jim Butler with 486 receiving yards.

Schedule

Roster

Notes

References

Tulsa
Tulsa Golden Hurricane football seasons
Tulsa Golden Hurricane football